The Torre Glòries, formerly known as Torre Agbar, is a 38-story skyscraper located between Avinguda Diagonal and Carrer Badajoz, near Plaça de les Glòries Catalanes, which marks the gateway to the new technological district of Barcelona, Catalonia, Spain. It was designed by French architect Jean Nouvel in association with the Spanish firm b720 Fermín Vázquez Arquitectos and built by Dragados. The Torre Glòries is located in the Poblenou neighbourhood of Barcelona and it was originally named after its owners, the Agbar Group, a holding company whose interests include the Barcelona water company Aigües de Barcelona.

The tower is 144.44 m high with a diameter of 39 m. It cost €130 million to build.

It opened in June 2005 and was officially opened by King Juan Carlos I on 16 September 2005. It is one in a collection of high-tech architecture examples in Barcelona.

The building was owned by the multinational group Agbar, which has its corporate headquarters in the building and which takes up most of the floors, leasing the remainder. The Agbar Tower was acquired in March 2010 for 165 million euros, after reaching an agreement with its former owner, the investment group Azurelau. Azurelau had previously bought the property in mid-2007. The purchase price was not disclosed.

By 2017 it was purchased by Merlin Properties real estate group and it was renamed as Torre Glòries after the name of the adjacent square.

Design
According to Jean Nouvel, Torre Agbar is intended to recall the shape of a geyser rising into the air. It was inspired by Montserrat, a mountain near Barcelona. In an interview, he described the tower as having a phallic character. As a result of its unusual shape, the building is known by several nicknames, such as el supositori ("the suppository"), l'obús ("the shell") and some more scatological ones. It is also somewhat similar in shape to Sir Norman Foster's 30 St. Mary Axe in London, often called "the Gherkin". The Agbar Tower measures  in height and consists of 38 storeys, including four underground levels.

Its design combines a number of different architectural concepts, resulting in a striking structure built with reinforced concrete, covered with a facade of glass, and over 4,500 window openings cut out of the structural concrete.

A defining feature of the building is its nocturnal illumination. It has 4,500 LED devices that allow generation of luminous images on its façade. In addition, the outside of the tower has temperature sensors that regulate the opening and closing of the window blinds of the façade, reducing the consumption of energy for air conditioning. It houses the head office of the Aigües de Barcelona Group, the water supply company of Barcelona.
 

As explained by Nouvel himself, the construction was strongly influenced by one of the most representative symbols of Catalan culture. One side references the bell towers of the Sagrada Familia by the Catalan architect Antoni Gaudí. (These bell towers were based in turn on the idea of the Hotel Attraction, a course project by the teacher Reus in 1908 for some New York hoteliers, which was redesigned in 1956 by his disciple Joan Matamala. These designs were included in Rem Koolhaas' book Delirious New York, a reference for many architects.) An additional tribute to the Sagrada Família lies in the north side of the tower, which was designed with the intention of obtaining an optimal view of the cathedral.

Additionally, Nouvel was inspired by the distinctive pinnacles of the Montserrat mountain range, which are of great significance for the people of Catalonia, as Montserrat houses their patron saint, Our Lady of Montserrat.

In designing the Agbar Tower, Nouvel said he rejected the prevailing North American opinion of what a skyscraper should look like. It was the architect's intention to give the impression of land that is emerging out of the ground in a particular fashion. The use of the tower by a water utility company led him to the design of a metaphor of a geyser sprouting from the deep sea.

Construction 
Starting in mid-1999, when activities were initiated for preparing the site, Dragados's, construction project dragged on for nearly six years, finally ending in late 2004. Approximately 1170 workers were engaged in its construction.

Features

Materials 
The main materials used in the construction of the building are concrete which comprises the structure of the tower and aluminium and glass in the form of 59,619 strips of painted sheet metal of different colours, covering the approximately 16,000 m2 of exterior surface. In addition, the glass has different inclinations and opacities which, combined with the different shades of aluminium, alter the colour balance of the tower as a function of time of day and season of the year.

The construction used 25,000 m3 of concrete and 125 tonnes of steel.

Form and structure 
The tower is made up of two concentric concrete oval cylinders which do not come in contact with each other. The outer cylinder, which completely encases the inner cylinder is covered by a dome of glass and steel which gives the tower its characteristic shape of a bullet. This outer cylinder with a thickness of 45 cm at the base and 25 cm at the top contains approximately 4,500 windows, while the inner cylinder measuring 50 cm at the base and 30 cm at the highest point, is where the lifts, stairs and facilities are located.

Distribution 
The building contains 38 floors of which 34 are above ground and four floors are underground. Two of the underground floors host an auditorium for 316 people in addition to other services areas while the other two are intended for parking. Of the 34 floors located above the ground, 28 are for offices, three are technical plants hosting building facilities, one is dedicated to multipurpose rooms, another houses the cafeteria and the last is intended to be a viewing platform just below the top of the tower.

Lighting 
One of the most characteristic elements of the building is its nocturnal illumination. The tower has more than 4,500 luminous devices that can operate independently using LED technology and enables the generation of images on the outside of the tower. The system is capable of creating 16 million colours, thanks to a sophisticated system of hardware and software. It has the ability to quickly transition between colours which can create a shocking effect.

During Christmas, New Year and other events the tower changes color in animated computer controlled sequences.

The unique lighting system of the building, dubbed by its creator Yann Kersalé as diffraction, who defined it as "a vaporous cloud of colour that seeks moiré", is often used in the celebration of various events such as the naming of Barcelona as the capital of the Union for the Mediterranean or the 50th anniversary of Treaty of Rome.

A symbol of Barcelona 
Once it was finished, the Agbar Tower quickly became an architectural icon of the city of Barcelona and one of its most famous buildings. However, it was not initially immune to criticism from citizens and experts who said that its characteristics did not fit into the architecture of Barcelona. Over time it has become one of the symbols that universally identify the Catalan capital and is one of its tourist attractions.

In mid-2008, a number of Catalan public institutions made a list that included the major cultural icons in the Autonomous Community that were meant to serve as models for tourist souvenirs which identity Catalonia, and the tower was included in it.

The popularity of the tower to tourists is such that a visit to the tower has become a part of tourist bus routes (and even the helicopter tour) and many tourists take an opportunity to visit the inside.

Ringing in the New Year 
Since 2006, TV3, the main Catalan regional television service, has used the capabilities the special lighting system at the Agbar Tower offered to show end of year celebrations. This has become the venue chosen by thousands of locals and visitors to the city to welcome the New Year. This choice of the tower as an icon of the city for New Year celebrations have allowed Barcelona to begin to appear on television around the world alongside those of famous landmarks in cities such as Sydney, Madrid, Paris, London or New York City. Prior to 2006 this did not occur because the places chosen by TV3 lacked the international recognition that the Jean Nouvel tower provides.

Curiosities 
The tower has twice been climbed by Alain Robert. The first, on 3 August 2006, was an action that sought to call for peace in the conflict in Lebanon. The second was in September 2007.
In 2007, "Torre Agbar" was recorded in the Spanish Patent and Trademark office, by the company Aigües de Barcelona, for use as a brand of alcoholic beverages.
In 2011, the tower received a green building award from the European Council for its energy efficiency and low CO2 emissions.

Gallery

See also
 30 St Mary Axe, also known as "The Gherkin", and occasionally as The Swiss Re Tower, is an architecturally similar building in London which opened a year and a half earlier, in April 2004.
 Alain Robert, a famous climber who has scaled the building.

References

External links

 Torre Agbar web page (Macromedia Flash)

El Poblenou
Avinguda Diagonal
Buildings and structures completed in 2004
Skyscraper office buildings in Barcelona
Sant Martí (district)
Jean Nouvel buildings
Modernist architecture in Barcelona
High-tech architecture